Komárov (Hungarian since 1907: Felsőkomaróc) is a  
village and municipality in Bardejov, Prešov, Slovakia.

History
In historical records, the village was first mentioned in 1355.
Komárov has a Catholic Church (built circa 1490s), a soccer field, a small shop, a bar, a mortician, and the ruins of two castles. One of these has since been converted into a park with a tennis court and pool. There are three cemeteries, which has housed the earthly remains of citizens for hundreds of years.

In World War II, it was one of very few villages which never saw tanks, as the bridge was destroyed.

Geography
It has a population of about 405 people.
Komárov is somewhat unusual as a village, as it only has one way in or out via a bridge, and cannot be driven through.

Many immigrants from this town have settled in and around Bridgeport, Connecticut.

Economy
The village is mostly made up of farmers but there is a  nearby forest where logging has been done. Besides cattle and chicken, most farms produce cucumbers, tomatoes, and other vegetables. There are a good number of fruit trees, with pears being the most common.

The town also has a fairly large population of storks, some of which nest on the chimneys of houses.

Ethnicity
The village is entirely Slovak in population.

Genealogical resources

The records for genealogical research are available at the state archive "Statny Archiv in Presov, Slovakia"

 Roman Catholic church records (births/marriages/deaths): 1789-1897 (parish B)
 Greek Catholic church records (births/marriages/deaths): 1753-1906 (parish B)

See also
 List of municipalities and towns in Slovakia

References

External links
 
 
https://web.archive.org/web/20080111223415/http://www.statistics.sk/mosmis/eng/run.html 
Surnames of living people in Komarov

Villages and municipalities in Bardejov District
Šariš